Maryland White Lead Works is a historic lead paint factory complex located at Baltimore, Maryland, United States. It is a "U"-shaped industrial complex constructed about 1867.  It consists of nine interconnected brick and wood-frame buildings, which vary in height from one to four stories, surrounding a yard. The complex includes the powerhouse, two production sheds, a manufactory loft with an office wing, and a service building. The Maryland White Lead Company occupied the site from 1867 to 1896, Baltimore's first and most substantial manufacturer of lead paints.

Maryland White Lead Works was listed on the National Register of Historic Places in 2002.

References

External links
Maryland White Lead Works, Baltimore City, including photo from 2001, at Maryland Historical Trust

Buildings and structures in Baltimore
Industrial buildings and structures on the National Register of Historic Places in Baltimore
Industrial buildings completed in 1867
Locust Point, Baltimore
1867 establishments in Maryland